The statue of Winston Churchill is a standing bronze statue of statesman and writer Winston Churchill, situated in the Members' Lobby of the House of Commons of the United Kingdom, part of the Palace of Westminster complex in Westminster, Central London. Churchill is depicted mid-stride, with his hands on his hips.

Churchill and Nemon first met in Marrakech in 1951, where Nemon sculpted a terracotta bust that Churchill's wife, Lady Clementine Churchill said "represents to me my husband as I see him and as I think of him". In 1952, on Churchill's recommendation, Nemon made a bust of him at the request of Elizabeth II for Windsor Castle. Nemon also made a seated bronze sculpture of Churchill for the City of London's Guildhall, which Churchill described as a 'very good likeness' upon its unveiling in 1955.

See also
 Statue of Margaret Thatcher, Palace of Westminster
 Statue of Winston Churchill, Parliament Square

References

1970 sculptures
Bronze sculptures in the City of Westminster
Monuments and memorials in London
Palace of Westminster
Sculptures by Oscar Nemon
Churchill, Winston
London, Palace of Westminster
Churchill, Winston